Discoplax longipes is a species of terrestrial crab. It is found in karstic caves on Pacific islands and ranges from the Loyalty Islands to French Polynesia (the Guam population was recognized as a separate species, D. michalis, in 2015). Mating occurs in the caves, after which the females migrate to the sea to release their fertilised eggs. The genus Discoplax was for a long time synonymised with Cardisoma, but was resurrected in the late 20th century.

References

External links 
 
 

Grapsoidea
Terrestrial crustaceans
Crustaceans described in 1867